The men's 10 kilometre sprint biathlon competition at the 1994 Winter Olympics was held on 23 February, at Birkebeineren Ski Stadium. Each miss was penalized by requiring the competitor to race over a 150-metre penalty loop.

Results

References

Men's biathlon at the 1994 Winter Olympics